Gravity Omutujju is a Ugandan rapper. He is one of the greatest top Luga flow artists who rap in Luganda. He has collaborated with Music heavy weights like Eddy kenzo, David Lutalo, King Saha, Catherine Kusasira etc

Early life and education
Gravity Omutujju real name Gereson Wabuyi was born in 1993 in Nakulabye. He was born to  Micheal Gesa (father) and Jane Kajoina (mother). He attended Nankulabye Junior School for his primary education and Old Kampala secondary school for his ordinary level secondary education.

Career 
Gravity started singing while at Old Kampala Secondary school where eventually decided to get a stage name of Gravity Omutujju. At the age 17 while Senior four vacation, he connected to music producers Peterson of Redemption studios and Ruff x and Peterson recorded his first song called Joanita.

He later joined producer Didi in Makindye based group called Born fire where he connected with other music artists. He continues to rival with fellow musicians like Bebe Cool, Chameleon,Bobiwine, GNL ZAMBA, Navio, Babaluku. He's of recently seen criticisng the media of taking his jokes at other musicians as serious. He's of recently musically attacked by Zex Bilangilangi(kidoogo) Yung Mulo(baby ndunya).

Discography
 Walumbe zaya, 2011
 Omwooto, 2015
 Broken English, 2016
 Ekyakuzala, 2019
 Embuzi zakutidde, 2018
 Omusomesa, 2015
 Joanita, 2013
 Kappa yo, 2019
 Balance the boat, 2018
 Towakana, 2015
 Teri dogo, 2014
 Hits, 2015
 Tunyumize, 2016
 Bitandise, 2020
 Nyabo, 2020
 Abanyampi, 2019
 Wakulemye, 2015
 Ampalana, 2018
 Malangajja, 2013

Awards and recognition
Winner - Teeniez Breakout Artist 2013
Winner - Best Hip Hop Song at the HiPipo Music Awards 2013
Buzz Tenniez awards – breakthrough artist of the year, 2013
Hipipo music awards – Hip hop song of the year, 2013
MTN hip hop awards – most downloaded song, 2016
MTN hip hop awards – best rapper central, 2019

Nominations 

Nominated - Best Hip Hop song at the HiPipo Music Awards 2014
Nominated - Best Munyole musician in East Africa

References

External links 
All Gravity Omutujju songs
 

1993 births
Ugandan musicians
Living people
Kumusha